"Love Yourself" is a 2015 single by Justin Bieber.

Love Yourself may also refer to:

Music by BTS
Love Yourself: Wonder, the music video theme for the group's song "Euphoria"
Love Yourself: Her, the group's fifth extended play
Love Yourself: Tear, the group's third Korean studio album and sixth overall
Love Yourself: Answer, the group's second compilation album
BTS World Tour: Love Yourself, the group's third worldwide concert tour

Music by other artists
 Love Yourself (album), by Prudence Liew, 2000
 "Love Yourself" (Billy Porter song), 2019
 "Love Yourself" (Mary J. Blige song), 2017
 "Love Yourself (Kimi ga Kirai na Kimi ga Suki)", by Kat-Tun, 2010 
 "Love Yourself", a 1996 song by Blueboy
 "Love Yourself", a 1997 song by Karen Mok from To Be
 "Love Yourself", a 2019 song by Sufjan Stevens

See also
 Love Myself (disambiguation)